The Redlands Daily Facts is a paid daily newspaper based in Redlands, California, serving the Redlands area. The Daily Facts is a member of Southern California News Group  (formerly the Los Angeles Newspaper Group), a division of Digital First Media.

Founded in 1890, the paper was purchased by Donrey Media in 1981. It is now owned by Digital First Media, who took control of the paper from Donrey in 1999.

The Redlands Daily Facts began as a weekly newspaper in 1890 and was transformed into a daily paper two years later by owner Edgar F. Howe. Howe sold the business to Capt. William G. Moore in 1895 who passed it on to his son Paul before Moore's death in 1899. In 1901, the Redlands Daily Facts joined the Associated Press. Paul Moore died in 1942 leaving the paper in the hands of his sons; Frank the editor and Bill the publisher. The Moore brothers sold the paper to the Donrey Media Group in 1981. In 1982 The Redlands Daily Facts began publishing a 6-day paper, Sunday through Friday, in the mid 1990s. The newspaper returned to a 7-day publication on September 4, 2010.

References

External links
Official Redlands Daily Facts website

Daily newspapers published in Greater Los Angeles
Redlands, California
Mass media in the Inland Empire
Mass media in San Bernardino County, California
Companies based in San Bernardino County, California
MediaNews Group publications
Digital First Media
Publications established in 1890
1890 establishments in California